The East Bay Express is an Oakland-based weekly newspaper serving the Berkeley, Oakland and East Bay region of the San Francisco Bay Area. It is distributed throughout Alameda County and parts of Contra Costa County every Wednesday.

The Express is known for its investigative and longform news and feature stories, along with its award-winning arts, food and wine coverage. The paper is also well known for its opinionated viewpoint and for engaging in advocacy journalism.

A typical issue of the Express contains one or two in-depth news stories; an "Eco Watch" column about environmental issues; a political column called Seven Days; a cover story, events and music listings; music, dining and movie reviews; a culture column; a parenting column; a tech column; and the syndicated columns "Savage Love" and Free Will Astrology. As of September 2020, Josh Koehn is its editor and D. Scott Miller is its arts editor. Daedalus Howell served as editor-at-large after its sale by Telegraph Media to Metro Newspapers in the Spring of 2020 until Keohn was hired as its permanent editor.

History
The first edition of the Express was published in October 1978, during Governor Jerry Brown's first stint as governor of California. The Express was an independent publication at the time and its first editor was veteran journalist John Raeside; 1978 also saw the passage of Proposition 13 and the election of Oakland's first African-American mayor, Lionel Wilson. During the 1980s, the paper covered the rise and fall of Oakland drug lords Felix Mitchell and Mickey Moore, the closure of the Keystone Berkeley nightclub and student protests at UC Berkeley that urged the regents to divest from apartheid South Africa. In 1989, the Express reported extensively on the 1989 Loma Prieta earthquake and the collapse of the Cypress Structure on I-880.

In the 1990s, the paper reported on the devastating 1991 East Bay Hills firestorm; the decision by Mills College in Oakland to admit male students for the first time; the rise of the crack cocaine epidemic; the rapid growth of development in Emeryville; the passage of the anti-immigration measure, Prop 187; the closure of East Bay military bases; the election of ex-state legislator Elihu Harris as mayor of Oakland; the return of the Oakland Raiders from Los Angeles; and the election of Jerry Brown as mayor of Oakland.

The paper was sold in February, 2001 to New Times Media. Editor John Raeside was replaced as editor of the Express by longtime journalist Stephen Buel, and the Express new tabloid layout replaced the original quarter-fold design. In October 2006, New Times merged with the parent company of The Village Voice to form Village Voice Media.

During the Aughts, the Express was the first news outlet to report on the bloody legacy of Your Black Muslim Bakery in Oakland. Members of the bakery were later convicted of murdering Oakland journalist Chauncey Bailey. Throughout the decade, the Express also closely covered the FBI investigation of then-state Senator Don Perata of Oakland. In addition, the paper reported on The Riders scandal in the Oakland Police Department; the rise of the hyphy music scene; the election of Ron Dellums as mayor of Oakland; and the Oakland A's' aborted attempts to move to Fremont and San Jose.

On 17 May 2007, Village Voice Media announced the Express was being bought by then-editor Stephen Buel and a group of investors including Hal Brody. Jody Colley became publisher that year, and then Jay Youngdahl acquired majority control of the paper in August 2010. In December 2010, co-editors Robert Gammon and Kathleen Richards took over for Stephen Buel.

In 2010, Express reported on the election of Jean Quan as mayor of Oakland; Quan defeated ex-state Senator Don Perata. During the decade, the paper also covered the rise of progressives in Richmond, the tenure of Mayor Tom Bates in Berkeley, the growth of Oakland's food scene and the election of Libby Schaaf as mayor of Oakland. In 2014, Robert Gammon became sole editor of the paper when Kathleen Richards moved to Seattle to serve as editor of The Stranger. Nick Miller came to the Express as editor in 2016.

In 2017, Telegraph Media, owned by Stephen Buel and Judith Gallman, acquired the Express. Kathleen Richards returned as editor-in-chief and Buel, who had been editor from 2001 to 2010, became publisher.  Buel resigned this role in 2018 after admitting to taking down several blog posts about race issues in music that he disagreed with and using a racial slur in a related editorial meeting. Gammon then took on the role of publisher of the Express, and became editor again later in the year as well when Richards left, while Buel and Gallman remained majority owners.

In early 2019, following a court ruling against the Express in a lawsuit and in the midst of Buel and Gallman's ongoing efforts to sell their publications, management laid off six employees (including most of the editorial staff and full-time staff writers), at which point Buel again took on the role of publisher. Less than a month later, Gammon left the paper to take a position in the office of California State Senator Nancy Skinner.

In March 2020, the Express was sold to Weeklys, a 17-title regional media group that includes the North Bay Bohemian, the Pacific Sun, Santa Cruz’s Good Times, and Metro Silicon Valley.

Awards
2001
Express writers won four 2001 East Bay Press Club awards; the winners were Kara Platoni, Will Harper and Lisa Drostova.

2002
The Express won three 2002 awards from the Northern California Chapter of the Society of Professional Journalists; the winners were Justin Berton, Will Harper and Kara Platoni.

2003
The Express received several honors from the Association of Alternative Newsweeklies; the winners were: Mike Mechanic, Jesse Reklaw, Wahab Algarmi, Alixopulos, Stephen Buel, Josh Frankel, Fredo, Malcolm Gay, Hellen Jo, David Lasky, Thien Pham, Lark Pien, Chris Thompson, Mark Gartland and Jonathan Kauffman.

2004
The Express took top honors in four non-daily print categories in the 2003-2004 Excellence in Journalism awards, which are sponsored by the Society of Professional Journalists' Northern California chapter; the winners were: Chris Thompson, who topped the Depth Reporting category with "The AXT Way" (3/21/04). Editorial Fellow Malcolm Gay was honored as Best Emerging Journalist. Staff writer Susan Goldsmith won Best Feature Story for "Frank's War" (4/28/04). "2003 Illustrated," won the Graphic Journalism category for its co-coordinators Michael Mechanic and Jesse Reklaw.

Staff writer Kara Platoni won the 2004 Evert Clark/Seth Payne Award, a national prize given to young science writers.

The Express won twelve awards in the San Francisco/East Bay Press Club's 2004 Excellence in Print Journalism Contest. Will Harper won best columnist and first place in the business feature category for "Publisher for the People" (9/29/04). Kara Platoni won first place for technology coverage for "I, Robot" (4/14/04). She also won second place in the business news competition for "Latinos Warn of 'False' Credit Card" (9/1/04). Platoni also won first place in the lifestyle feature category for "What a Steal" (11/3/04). Lauren Gard won first place in the long feature category for "Good Kids, Bad Blood" (8/11/04). In sports features, Chris Togneri took first place for "Eve of Destruction" (8/18/04). Susan Goldsmith took third place for "Mortal Combat" (1/14/04). Justin Berton won first place in the profile category for "Lizard Is a Rat" (10/20/04). Music editor Rob Harvilla won second place in the criticism or reviewing category. In the in-depth or investigative reporting category, Robert Gammon took second place for "Fire and Ice Cream" (9/22/04) and Chris Thompson took third place for "The AXT Way" (3/24/04).

2005
The International Society of Weekly Newspaper Editors honored Express columnist Chris Thompson with one of its prestigious 2005 Golden Dozen Awards.

The National Association of Black Journalists awarded a first place honor to Lauren Gard for "Good Kids, Bad Blood."

Kara Platoni won a Clarion Award for best newspaper feature story for "The Ten Million Dollar Woman."

Three Express reporters won awards from the Northern California chapter of the Society of Professional Journalists in its 2005 journalism contest. In depth reporting, Robert Gammon won for "At Large." In the opinion category, Will Harper won for "What Media Monopoly?" And Rachel Swan was honored as an outstanding emerging journalist.

The Express won twelve awards, including five first places, in the East Bay Press Club's 2005 Awards for Print Journalism. Chris Thompson won first place in the lifestyle feature writing category for   "The Revolution Comes to Rossmoor" (5/16/05) and second place for his weekly column City of Warts. Robert Gammon won first place in the general news writing category for "Welcome to Pombo Country" (8/24/05). Illustrator Jon Langford took a second place in the illustration category. Gammon also took a third place for investigative/in-depth news writing for "At Large" (1/12/05). Justin Page took second place in the page design category. Kara Platoni earned first place in the profile writing category for "Remote Control" (11/9/05). Jonathan Kaminsky took first place for sports feature writing for "Wounded Warriors" (12/14/05). Alex Handy won a first place for business feature writing for "The Buzzmakers" (5/18/05). Laila Weir won second place for her cover story "Games Without Frontiers" (3/23/05). Jonathan Kauffman won third place in the criticism and reviewing category. And Justin Berton took third place in the profile writing category for "David Dondero's Opening Act" (1/19/05).

2006
The Express won three awards in the Association of Alternative Newsweeklies' 2006 AltWeekly Awards contest. David Downs won first place in the arts feature category for "Roboscalper" (3/30/05). Rob Harvilla won third place in music criticism. And Will Harper won honorable mention for best feature story for "A Man Named Sue" (9/28/2005).

Jonathan Kauffman won top honors for restaurant criticism from the national Association of Food Journalists in its 2006 awards contest. And Anneli Rufus was honored for criticism in the 2006 Excellence in Journalism awards, hosted by the Northern California chapter of the Society of Professional Journalists.

The Express won first-place awards in the 2006 Missouri Lifestyle Journalism Awards. In the Fashion and Design category, Kara Platoni won for "What a Steal!" (3/11/04). In the Food and Nutrition category, Will Harper won for "The O Word" (1/5/05).

The Express won nine first-place awards—and seventeen awards overall—in the East Bay Press Club's 2006 Excellence in Print Journalism contest. Robert Gammon won first place in the General News category for  "We're Outta Here" (4/12/06). He won first place in the Business Feature category for "Trouble in the Air" (10/18/06). And Gammon and Chris Thompson won in the Sports Feature category for "The Fremont Athletics" (11/29/06). Kara Platoni won second place in the In-Depth or Investigative Reporting category for "Dealing in Death" (7/5/06). John Birdsall won third place in the Criticism or Reviewing category for On Food. Rachel Swan tied for third place in the Best Profile category with "The Player and the Pilgrim" (11/22/06). Stephen Buel won third place in the Long Feature category for "The Quick and the Dead" (7/26/06). Chris Thompson also won first place for Best Technology story, "Publishers vs. the Censorbot" (8/2/06). Thompson also won Best Columnist for City of Warts. Lauren Gard won first place for Best Profile for "What's Wrong with This Picture?" (12/6/06) and first place in Lifestyle Feature category for "Fat! Fit? Fabulous!" (9/13/06). David Downs won first place in the Criticism or Reviewing category. He also won third place in the Business News category for "Drinking the Bills Away" (7/5/06) and third place in the Best Editorial category for "Smooth Criminal Fingers" (10/11/06). Eliza Strickland won first place in the Long Feature category for "Identity Theft" (1/25/06). She also won third place in the Best Technology category for "Nice Nanostuff, But Is It Safe?" (1/25/06). Alex Handy won second place in Lifestyle Feature for "They Walk Among Us" (6/7/06).

2007
The Express won four awards in the 2007 East Bay press Club Excellence in Print Journalism contest. Rachel Swan won a first place for cultural affairs reporting. Nate Seltenrich won third place in the cultural affairs reporting category for "The Indian Hunter." And Robert Gammon won second place in in-depth/investigative reporting for "Living Large" and "My Fair Lady." Gammon also won third place in the best columnist category.

2008
The Express won five awards, including three first-places, in the East Bay Press Club's annual Excellence in Print Journalism Contest for 2008. Nate Seltenrich won first place in the Lifestyle Feature writing category for "Writers, Unblocked" (August 6, 2008). Robert Gammon won first-place in the Best Opinion writing category for "The Torture Professor" (May 14, 2008). He also one first place for Best Analysis writing for "Tip of the Iceberg." Gammon also earned a second-place award in the Best Series category for "The Belgian Connection." And he took third place in the In-depth or Investigative Reporting category for "Arrests Are Down and Crime Is Up" (December 3, 2008).

2010
Kathleen Richards' investigative story, "Yelp and the Business of Extortion 2.0" won first place for in-depth, investigative reporting at both the 2010 East Bay Press Club's Excellence in Print Journalism Contest and the 2010 Society of Professional Journalists awards.

2011
The Express won a first-place award in the 2011 Price Child Health and Welfare Journalism contest for "Pushing Foster Children off the Plank" by Angela Kilduff.

2012
The Express won three honors: The Northern California Independent Booksellers Association gave an award to publisher Jody Colley; Ali Winston, Joaquin Palomino and Robert Gammon were honored by PUEBLO, Oakland's police watchdog group; and Rachel Swan won an excellence in journalism award from the Society of Professional Journalists of Northern California.

The Express won eight awards, including seven first-place honors, in the annual Greater Bay Area Journalism Awards contest. Ellen Cushing won first place in the best business/technology story for "The Digital Sweatshop" (8/1). Cushing also shared a first-place award with Rachel Swan in the entertainment category for "Traveling Bands Do Not Cross" (1/18). Robert Gammon won a first-place award in the continuing coverage category and then shared a first-place award with Ali Winston, Darwin BondGraham and Joaquin Palomino in the best series category. BondGraham also won first place in the best analysis category for "From Brown to Green" (1/25). Ashley Bates won first place in the news story category for "Radioactive Isle" (9/5). Kibby Kleiman won first place for best sports story for "Moneyball 2.0: The Pitching Whisperer" (9/12). And Rachel Swan won a second-place award in the specialty story category for "The Shrinking Stage" (4/4).

The Express won two awards in the annual Association of Alternative Newsmedia contest. Rachel Swan won a first-place award in the arts feature category for "The Shrinking Stage." And Kathleen Richards won a third-place award in the long-form news category for "How Much Garbage Does It Take to Treat a Patient?"

2013
The Express won two awards for journalism excellence from the Society of Professional Journalists, Northern California Chapter. Darwin BondGraham won first place in the investigative reporting category for "Public Research for Private Gain." And Ellen Cushing won a first place in arts and culture reporting for "The Bacon-Wrapped Economy."

The Express won a national award for journalism excellence in science reporting from the American Association for the Advancement of Science for Azeen Ghorayshi's story, "Warning: Quake in 60 Seconds."

The Express won nine awards for journalism excellence, including six first-place honors, in the 37th Annual Greater Bay Area Journalism Awards. Ali Winston and Darwin BondGraham won first place in the continuing coverage category. BondGraham also won a third-place honor in the business/technology story category for "Public Research for Private Gain." Robert Gammon and Joaquin Palomino won first place in the best series category for "Tunnel Vision: Delta in Peril and Rivers in Peril." Gammon also won a first place award in the news column category for his weekly column Seven Days. Rebecca Ruiz won first place for best feature story of a serious nature for "Life, Death and PTSD in Oakland." Vanessa Rancaño won first place in the specialty story category for "Waste: The Dark Side of the New Coffee Craze." Mark C. Anderson won first place for best sports story for "Real Warriors." Azeen Ghorayshi won a second-place award in the best news story category for "Warning: Quake in 60 Seconds." And Brian Kelly won a second-place award in the page design category for "False Witness."

The Express won six awards for journalism excellence in the Association of Alternative Newsmedia national contest. The paper won the most awards of any alt-weekly in California and tied for the third most honors nationwide among all alt-weeklies. Azeen Ghorayshi won first place in the long-form news category for "Warning: Quake in Sixty Seconds." Vanessa Rancaño won second place in the same category for "Waste: The Dark Side of the New Coffee Craze." Rachel Swan won second place in the economic inequality reporting for "Debtor's Purgatory." Sam Lefebvre won a third-place award in the music criticism category for "Ava Mendoza's Natural Way" (4/3/13); "The Two Sides of Tony Molina" 5/8/13); and "A Man Without a Country (8/28/13)." Ali Winston and Darwin BondGraham won third place in the beat coverage category. Ellen Cushing won third place in the arts feature category for "The Bacon-Wrapped Economy."

2014
The Express won two first-place awards for journalism excellence and shared in another in the Society of Professional Journalism contest for Northern California news organizations. Sam Levin won a first place in the Arts and Culture reporting category for "When Corporations Want Profits, They Don't Ask for Permission." Kathleen Richards won first place in the Feature Storytelling category for "Hunting with a Rat." And Joaquin Palomino won in the Outstanding Emerging Journalist category for "California's Thirsty Almonds" (2/5/14) and "The Water Tunnel Boondoggle" (5/13/14. Palomino was also honored for his report, "Archaeology's Poisonous Past," in High Country News.

Notable stories
Express humorist Alice Kahn claimed to have coined the word "yuppie" in a 1983 column. This claim is disputed, but no definitive origin for the word has been determined.

In 2002, the paper's coverage played a crucial role in uncovering the Your Black Muslim Bakery scandal.

The Express placed actor Gary Coleman on the ballot for governor in the 2003 California recall election as a satirical comment on the recall of Democratic Governor Gray Davis.

A 2005 profile of the environmentalist Van Jones noted that he had, in his youth, identified as a "communist" and been a member of the activist group Standing Together to Organize a Revolutionary Movement (STORM).

In February 2009, the paper uncovered an alleged extortion scam by the user review website Yelp, Inc. After the story's publication, several lawsuits were filed against the company.

References

External links

Newspapers published in the San Francisco Bay Area
Alternative weekly newspapers published in the United States
Mass media in Berkeley, California
Mass media in Oakland, California
Companies based in Oakland, California
Newspapers established in 1978
1978 establishments in California
Weekly newspapers published in California